A Moment's Peace is a 2011 studio album by jazz guitarist John Scofield, with keyboardist Larry Goldings, bassist Scott Colley and drummer Brian Blade.

Track listing 
All songs written by John Scofield except as indicated.
 "Simply Put" – 5:30
 "I Will" (Lennon–McCartney) – 3:16
 "Lawns" (Carla Bley) – 6:32
 "Throw It Away" (Abbey Lincoln) – 6:05
 "I Want to Talk About You" (Billy Eckstein) – 7:56
 "Gee, Baby, Ain't I Good to You" (Andy Razaf, Don Redman) – 5:01
 "Johan" – 5:11
 "Mood Returns" – 4:27
 "Already September" – 5:33
 "You Don't Know What Love Is" (Gene De Paul, Don Raye) – 6:00
 "Plain Song" – 5:01
 "I Loves You Porgy" (George & Ira Gershwin) – 3:59

Personnel 
 John Scofield - guitar
 Larry Goldings - piano and organ
 Scott Colley - bass
 Brian Blade - drums

References

2011 albums
Post-bop albums
John Scofield albums